Sergio Pérez (born 1990) is a Mexican racing driver.

Sergio Pérez may also refer to:
 Sergio Pérez (baseball) (born 1984), Minor League baseball pitcher
 Sergio Pérez Moya (born 1986), Mexican footballer
 Sergio Arturo Perez (born 1968), Cuban Paralympic judoka
 Sergio Pérez Pérez (born 1984), Spanish tennis player
 Sergio Pérez (footballer, born 1988), Uruguayan footballer
 Sergio Pérez (footballer, born 1993), Spanish footballer
 Sergio Pérez (footballer, born 1997), Spanish footballer
 Sergio Pérez Betancourt, Venezuelan violinist with Adrenalina Caribe